Mechanicsville Village Historic District, also known as Fenton's Corner, New-Work, and Halifax, is a national historic district located at Mechanicsville, Buckingham Township, Bucks County, Pennsylvania.  The district includes 27 contributing buildings in the crossroads village of Mechanicsville. They include a variety of residential, commercial, and institutional buildings, some of which are representative of the vernacular Late Victorian style. The residential buildings are predominantly -story, wood and stone structures, some of which date to the early-19th century.  Notable buildings include the Samuel Wilson Seed House (c. 1885), Thomas Walton Store and Residence (before 1814), Joseph Burger House (c. 1860),  Thomas Walton Tenant House (c. 1815), Phineas Hellyer House (c. 1815), George Nixon House (c. 1830), and William Fell House (c. 1810).

It was added to the National Register of Historic Places in 1989.

Gallery

References

Historic districts in Bucks County, Pennsylvania
Victorian architecture in Pennsylvania
Historic districts on the National Register of Historic Places in Pennsylvania
National Register of Historic Places in Bucks County, Pennsylvania